The Quai des Tuileries is a quay on the Right Bank of the River Seine in Paris, France, along the stretch close to where the Palais du Louvre and the Quai François Mitterrand is situated, in the 1st arrondissement.

Quai des Tuileries runs between the Pont du Carrousel and the Pont de la Concorde that cross the River Seine to the Left Bank. It is close to the Avenue du General Lemonnier and the Place de la Concorde. Vehicles may travel in one direction only.

See also 
 Passerelle Léopold-Sédar-Senghor, a footbridge
 Tuileries Garden
 Tuileries Palace
Tunnel des Tuileries

References

External links 
 Quai des Tuileries — Paris (France) on Flickr

Tuileries
Buildings and structures in the 1st arrondissement of Paris
River Seine